In mathematics, Scholz's reciprocity law is a reciprocity law for quadratic residue symbols of real quadratic number fields discovered by  and rediscovered by .

Statement
Suppose that p and q are rational primes congruent to 1 mod 4 such that the Legendre symbol (p/q) is 1. Then the ideal (p) factorizes in the ring of integers of Q() as (p)=𝖕𝖕' and similarly (q)=𝖖𝖖' in the ring of integers of Q().
Write εp and εq for the fundamental units in these quadratic fields. Then Scholz's reciprocity law says that
[εp/𝖖] = [εq/𝖕] 
where [] is the quadratic residue symbol in a quadratic number field.

References

Theorems in algebraic number theory